The Seated Woman of Çatalhöyük (also Çatal Höyük) is a baked-clay, nude female form, seated between feline-headed arm-rests. It is generally thought to depict a corpulent and fertile Mother goddess in the process of giving birth while seated on her throne, which has two hand rests in the form of feline (lioness, leopard, or panther) heads in a Mistress of Animals motif. The statuette, one of several iconographically similar ones found at the site, is associated to other corpulent prehistoric goddess figures, of which the most famous is the Venus of Willendorf.

It is a neolithic sculpture shaped by an unknown artist, and was completed in approximately 6000 BC. It was unearthed by archaeologist James Mellaart in 1961 at Çatalhöyük, Turkey. When it was found, its head and hand rest of the right side were missing. The current head and the hand rest are modern replacements. The sculpture is at the Museum of Anatolian Civilizations in Ankara, Turkey.

Mellaart claimed that the figure represented a fertility goddess worshipped by the people of Çatalhöyük. He also labeled the site a matriarchy. Annalee Newitz suggests two reasons for this interpretation. First, Mellaart may have been influenced by the theories of James George Frazer and Robert Graves, proponents of the idea of a "mother goddess." Second, Newitz argues that Mellaart believed a patriarchal society would not have created "nonsexual figures of naked women." Lynn Meskell, on the other hand, noted that female figurines are rare when the entirety of figures found at Çatalhöyük is taken into account. Based on her research, Newitz suggests that the sculpture instead represents an ancestor or perhaps a talisman.

See also
 Cybele
 List of Stone Age art
 Venus figurines

Notes

References 
Mellaart, James : Çatal Hüyük, A Neolithic Town in Anatolia, London, 1967
Guide book of "The Anatolian Civilizations Museum"
Lecture of Dr. R. Tringham, The Neolithic World of Çatalhöyük, at the University of Leuven

External links
 When the Goddesses Ruled - Çatal Hüyük
 The Goddess Uncovered

Prehistoric sculpture
Mother goddesses
Ceramic sculptures
Neolithic
Konya Province
Archaeological discoveries in Turkey
Prehistoric art in Turkey
Ancient Near East art and architecture
1961 archaeological discoveries